The Missouri elections took place on November 4, 2014

United States House of Representatives

State Auditor 

The 2014 Missouri State Auditor election was held on November 4, 2014, to elect the State Auditor of Missouri, concurrently with other state and federal elections.

Incumbent Republican State Auditor Tom Schweich ran for re-election to a second term in office.

References

 
Missouri